"Questions and Answers" is a song by Scottish rock band Biffy Clyro, and was the second single to be released from their 2003 album, The Vertigo of Bliss; It was their first single to enter the top 40 of the UK Singles Chart, reaching a peak of number 26. It was also their first top-ten single in their home country, reaching number nine on the Scottish Singles Chart. The music video, directed by Bradley Beesley and Dan Brown, was recorded with Simon Neil in a wheelchair after he broke his foot the night before the video shoot at a gig by jumping off the PA system. Brown said of the making of the video: "Brad and I flew to London in March of 2003 to shoot a video for Biffy Clyro (then signed to Beggars Banquet). We had very little money so we shot the video on DV, transferred the video to 35mm film and had a friend scratch animation on the films negative. He also painted frames with sharpies to give it a retro/psychedelic feel. I brought my small sony handycam and shot home movies during the shoot. This was the first of three videos we made for Simon, James and Ben. Who were, without a doubt, the absolute best to work with."

Track listings
Songs and lyrics by Simon Neil. Music by Biffy Clyro.

CD 1 (BBQ368CD)
 "Questions and Answers (Single Edit)" – 3:46
 "Good Practice Makes Permanent" – 4:19
 "Let's Get Smiling" – 3:04

CD 2 (BBQ368CD2)
 "Questions and Answers (Single Edit)" – 3:46
 "Muckquaikerjawbreaker" – 4:10
 "I Hope You're Done" – 3:40

7" (BBQ368)
 "Questions and Answers (Single Edit)" – 3:46
 "Muckquaikerjawbreaker" – 4:10
 "Ewen's True Mental You" – 1:24

Personnel
 Simon Neil – guitar, vocals
 James Johnston – bass, vocals
 Ben Johnston – drums, vocals
 Chris Sheldon – producer

Charts

References

External links
"Questions and Answers" Lyrics
"Questions and Answers" Guitar Tablature

Biffy Clyro songs
Songs written by Simon Neil
Song recordings produced by Chris Sheldon
2003 songs
2003 singles
Beggars Banquet Records singles